James Robin Grant Laing (/ˈleɪŋ/ ; born 3 November 1988) is an English presenter, television personality and investor. He is the founder of the confectionery company Candy Kittens and best known for appearing on the reality television series Made in Chelsea since the second series in 2011. He runs and hosts two podcasts, Private Parts and a BBC Radio 1 podcast, 6 Degrees from Jamie and Spencer. As an actor, he has appeared in shows such as Hollyoaks, Murder In Successville and Drunk History.

Early life
Laing was born in Oxford in 1988. His parents are named Penny and Nicholas. He has an older brother, Alexander and a younger sister, Emily.

He attended Summer Fields School (1997–2002), Radley College and, later, the University of Leeds, where he studied Theatre and Performance.

Laing is a great-great-grandson of Sir Alexander Grant, 1st Baronet, who created the McVitie's digestive biscuit in 1892, and a great-nephew of the Lord Laing of Dunphail.

Career 
In 2011, Laing rose to fame through the E4 reality show Made in Chelsea, joining the show in the second series.

He launched his own confectionery company, Candy Kittens, in 2012, which specialises in vegan and vegetarian sweets.

Laing's acting credits include playing a fashion show attendee in 2016's Absolutely Fabulous: The Movie and a doctor in a 2017 episode of Channel 4 soap opera Hollyoaks.

He also beat the previous world record in ‘amount of jelly beans thrown in mouth per 30 seconds’ on Series 12 Episode 3 of 8 Out of 10 Cats Does Countdown with a groundbreaking 18 jellybeans; beating the previous record by 3.  

In 2017, he appeared on the first series of Celebrity Hunted alongside his Made in Chelsea co-star Spencer Matthews. In 2018, he appeared in the third episode of the first season of The Great Stand Up to Cancer Bake Off. Laing was named as one of the celebrities to star in the seventeenth series of Strictly Come Dancing in August 2019; however a foot injury led him to withdraw on 5 September, two days before the launch show was aired, where he was paired with professional dancer Oti Mabuse. He was replaced by Kelvin Fletcher, who went on to win the series. The following year, he was announced as a contestant on the eighteenth series, where he was re-partnered with Karen Hauer, making the final and finishing as one of the runners-up.

In 2018, he filmed a Channel 4 documentary called Famous and Fighting Crime, in which he became a volunteer police officer in Peterborough.

Since early 2017, he has hosted a podcast, Private Parts, with his friend Francis Boulle, as well as starting a podcast on BBC Sounds in May 2020, 6 Degrees from Jamie and Spencer, with Spencer Matthews.

From 28 October 2022, Laing provided maternity cover for Mollie King on BBC Radio 1.

Personal life
Laing lives with his fiancée, Sophie Charlotte Habboo (born 19 October 1993), whom he has been with since April 2019, in London and Gloucestershire.
Laing and Habboo announced their engagement on Instagram on 18 December 2021.

References

External links
 

1988 births
Living people
People from Oxford
21st-century English male actors
English male actors
People educated at Summer Fields School
People educated at Radley College
Alumni of the University of Leeds
British television personalities
Made in Chelsea
English television personalities